Dubai Sports Council is the official sports governing body of the Government of Dubai. It is the lead entity tasked with developing a holistic sports culture for the Emirate.

Sport in Dubai